The South Asian Post is a Canadian weekly newspaper published in Vancouver, British Columbia With a readership of 135,000 people, the newspaper targets the Indo-Canadian/Pakistani community in the city and province. The South Asian Post is a sister publication to The Asian Pacific Post, a weekly based in Vancouver.

In 2008, the South Asian Post won a Jack Webster Award for Best Community Reporting for the story "An Innocent Man".

References

External links 
Website

Asian-Canadian culture in Vancouver
Multicultural and ethnic newspapers published in Canada
Newspapers published in Vancouver
South Asian Canadian culture
Weekly newspapers published in British Columbia
Publications with year of establishment missing
Jack Webster award recipients